Harmon Sheldon Graves (October 4, 1870 – September 13, 1940) was an American football player, coach, and lawyer.  He served as the head coach at Lehigh University in 1893 and the United States Military Academy from 1894 to 1895, compiling a career college football record of 15–7.  Graves played football as a halfback at Yale University.  He later practiced law in New York City.

Head coaching record

References

External links

1870 births
1940 deaths
19th-century players of American football
American football halfbacks
Army Black Knights football coaches
Lehigh Mountain Hawks football coaches
Yale Bulldogs football players
Trinity College (Connecticut) alumni
Yale Law School alumni
New York (state) lawyers
People from Cambridge, New York